is a Japanese singer best known for various anime songs, particularly the opening for Cutie Honey. She rerecorded the openings for Cutie Honey and Majokko Megu-chan, titling them "21st century" versions, in 2008. The Cutie Honey opening was originally intended to be performed by Linda Yamamoto.

Anime Songs
Hyokkori Hyoutanjima (Hyokkori Hyoutanjima, 1963)
Wonderful Lilly (Rainbow Sentai Robin ED 2)
Princess Knight (Princess Knight OP, 1967)
Princess March (Princess Knight ED, 1967)
Along With the Wind (Pyunpyun Maru ED, 1967)
Magic of Mambo (Sally the Witch ED, 1967)
Piggyback Ghost ( Piggyback Ghost OP, 1972)
Cutie Honey (Cutie Honey OP, 1973)
Night Fog of Honey (Cutie Honey ED, 1973)
Majokko Megu-chan (Majokko Megu-chan OP, 1974)
Megu is All Alone (Majokko Megu-chan ED, 1974)
Pearl Colored Waltz (Maya the Bee ED 2, 1975)
That Child Asari-chan (Asari-chan OP, 1982)
I'm a Girl (Asari-chan ED, 1982)

References

Living people
Anime singers
20th-century Japanese women singers
20th-century Japanese singers
Year of birth missing (living people)
Atomi University alumni